The 2015–16 Alcorn State Braves basketball team represented Alcorn State University during the 2015–16 NCAA Division I men's basketball season. The Braves, led by first year head coach Montez Robinson, played their home games at the Davey Whitney Complex in Lorman, Mississippi and were members of the Southwestern Athletic Conference. The Braves finished the season 15–15, 13–5 in SWAC play to finish in second place. They lost to Mississippi Valley State in the quarterfinals of the SWAC tournament.

The Braves were ineligible for NCAA postseason play due to APR violations.

Previous season 
The Braves finished the 2014–15 season 6–26, 4–14 in SWAC play to finish in ninth place. They advanced to the quarterfinals of the SWAC tournament where they lost to Texas Southern.

On January 6, 2015, head coach Luther Riley took a personal leave of absence. Assistant coach Shawn Pepp led the Braves in Riley's absence. On March 23, 2015, it was announced that Riley's expiring contract would not be renewed.

On April 27, 2015, Montez Robinson was named head coach.

Roster

Schedule

|-
!colspan=9 style=| Exhibition

|-
!colspan=9 style=| Non-conference regular season

|-
!colspan=9 style=|SWAC regular season

|-
!colspan=9 style=| SWAC tournament

References

Alcorn State Braves basketball seasons
Alcorn State